Nadia Salem (born 1946) is an Egyptian filmmaker.

Life
Nadia Salem was born 23 September 1946. She graduated in journalism from the Faculty of Arts in Cairo in 1969, and from the directing section of the Cairo Higher Cinema Institute in 1979. She then joined the national Film Centre, where she directed several documentaries.

Films
 The Doorman is at Your Service / Saheb El Edara Bawab El Omara, 1985

References

External links
 

1946 births
Living people
Egyptian film directors
Egyptian women film directors